George Babb may refer to:
 George Herbert Babb (1864–1950), member of the Maine Senate
 George Fletcher Babb (1835–1915), American architect